Joyce Ohajah is a British journalist, previously working on ITV London's regional news programme, London Tonight, and the national ITV Morning News. She was formerly a regular presenter on the ITV News Channel.

References

Living people
ITN newsreaders and journalists
Year of birth missing (living people)
Black British television personalities
English people of Ghanaian descent